Amy Winifred Hawkins ( Evans, 24 January 1911 – 8 September 2021) was a Welsh supercentenarian and dancer from Monmouthshire in South Wales, who became famous for singing the World War I song It's a Long Way to Tipperary on her 110th birthday. The performance was uploaded to the TikTok video service by her 15-year-old great-grandson. She was also the oldest living person in Wales at the time of her death.

Hawkins was born in Cardiff in January 1911. In 1937, she married George Hawkins. During World War II, she served as a fire watcher in her neighbourhood. Hawkins had six siblings, amongst them five brothers and a surviving 101-year-old sister named Lillian.

She died in Monmouth on 8 September 2021, at the age of 110.

References

See also
Vera Lynn
Captain Sir Tom Moore

1911 births
2021 deaths
People from Cardiff
British supercentenarians
Welsh women
Women supercentenarians